The National Command Authority is the apex Government-led command to oversee the employment, policy formulation, exercises, deployment, research and development, and operational command and control of Pakistan's nuclear arsenals.

The National Command Authority was established in 2000 as a successor to Air Force Strategic Command which was established by the then-Chief of Air Staff Air Chief Marshal Anwar Shamim in 1983.

The National Command Authority is charged with joint-space operations (such as military satellites), information operations (such as information warfare), missile defense, internal and external command and control, intelligence, surveillance, and reconnaissance (C4ISR), and strategic deterrence, and combating weapons of mass destruction. The National Command Authority oversees the operations of the Pakistani Army, Air Force, and Navy's Strategic Commands, along with their functional basis. The unified military strategic command structure is intended to give the Prime Minister and Cabinet of Pakistan a unified resource for greater understanding of specific threats (military, nuclear, chemical, biological, radiological, conventional, and non-conventional, and intelligence) and the means to respond to those threats as quickly as possible to prevent the collateral damage. The civilian Prime Minister is the Chairman of this Command, with all military assets, components of NCA, and strategic commands directly reporting to Chairman of their course of development and deployment. Chairman Joint Chiefs of staff committee , Service Chiefs , and DG ISI are members of NCA , and DG SPD is the ex officio secretary of NCA , with SPD functioning as the NCA’s secretariat

Organizational structure
The NCA consists of the following nine ex officio members:

The Director-General of the NCA's Strategic Plans Division (SPD) is the ex officio Secretary of the NCA and the SPD functions as the NCA's secretariat. The current Secretary of NCA is Lt. General Yusuf Jamal.

Decision making in the NCA takes place through consensus and, in the event that consensus is not achieved, then through voting, with each member having a single vote.

Background
The Government of Pakistan felt the need to establish an administrative authority after Pakistan's first publicly announced atomic tests, Chagai-I and Chagai-II, in late May 1998 at the Ras Koh weapon-testing labs in the Chagai Hills range of Chagai District, and the Kharan Desert of Balochistan Province. The roots of such mechanism traced back to the 1970s when Prime Minister Zulfikar Ali Bhutto authorized the atomic bomb project to keep the projects safe from being exploited, politicized, or infiltrated by enemy powers attempting to sabotage them.

It is alleged by the former Chief of Army Staff, General Mirza Aslam Beg in 1994, that the Command was established in 1972 by former Prime Minister Zulfikar Ali Bhutto when he authorized the atomic bomb project.  The Joint Staff Headquarters (JS HQ) served its combatant operational command and is chaired by the Prime Minister. In 1994, General Beg retains: " (...).... The NCA determines the state of readiness which has to be maintained at all times... (sic)... and lays down in great detail the policy of how the various components will be placed, protected and safeguarded.".

In April 1999, the Chairman of the Joint Chiefs of Staff Committee and the Chief of Army Staff, General Pervez Musharraf developed a unified central command system to use nuclear and missile technology as part of the defence and security of nuclear assets under government control. Finally, the command was formally established and given commissioned on February 3, 2000, after approval by Pakistan's National Security Council. The command compromises the Economic Coordination Committee (ECC), the Development Control Committee (DCC), and a Strategic Plans Division (SPD).  The Prime Minister— Chief Executive (Head of Government) of the country served as its chairman while other members included the high-profile Ministers of Foreign Affairs, Defense (Military Production), Economic, Science, and Interior, the Chairman, Joint Chiefs of Staff, the chiefs of the Pakistani Armed Forces, and the Director-General of the SPD. The DCC includes the chairman of the joint chiefs of staff committee (as deputy chairman of DCC), the chiefs of the armed forces, the director general of the SPD, and a "representative of the strategic organization and scientific community (science adviser)".

Since the 1970s onward, the National Command Authority is responsible for policy formulation and will exercise employment and development control over all strategic nuclear forces and strategic organizations. It consists of an Employment Control Committee and a Development Control Committee, as well as the Strategic Plans Division (SPD) which acts as its secretariat. The SPD is responsible for the management and administration of the country's tactical and strategic nuclear weapons stockpile. It was created the same year as the NCA was formed.

Their directives are to be operationalized by a new SPD under the control of a Director-General at the rank of Lieutenant-General (Air Marshal or Vice-Admiral) in charge of the management and administration of the tactical and strategic nuclear forces. The current director-general of the SPD is Lt Gen Sarfraz Sattar after replacing Lieutenant-General Mazhar Jamil.

Since its establishment, Pervez Musharraf, as President of Pakistan, had served its first chairman. However, after the 2008 General Elections, Pakistani lawmakers introduced a new law which was passed unanimously by the Pakistani Parliament. The bill placed the NCA's Authority under the Prime Minister’s command.

Subordinate Commands

The directives of the NCA are to be operationalised by the:

Strategic Plans Division
Army Strategic Forces Command
Naval Strategic Forces Command
Air Force Strategic Command

See also 
Nuclear doctrine of Pakistan
List of missiles of Pakistan
Pakistan and weapons of mass destruction

References

External links 
 CSIS Missile Threat - Pakistan
 National Command Authority Act, 2010
 Global Security Report
 FAS Report

Military of Pakistan
Nuclear weapons programme of Pakistan
Pakistan federal departments and agencies
2000 establishments in Pakistan
Continuity of government in Pakistan
Government agencies established in 2000
Strategic forces of Pakistan